Grooving to the Moscow Beat is a 1996 album by the Red Elvises.

Track listing 
 Grooving to the Moscow Beat
 Boogie on the Beach
 Good Golly Miss Molly
 Please Don't Tell Me What I Did Last Night
 Tango
 Shooba-Doobah (Elvis's Vacation)
 My Love is Killing Me
 Leech
 Elvis and Bears
 Schorchi Chorniye
 Harriett
 Ballad of Elvis and Priscilla
 Sad Cowboy Song
 Romantic Junk

Credits 

 Igor Yuzov - Guitar, Vocals
 Zhenya Kholykanov - Guitar
 Andrey Baranov - Drums
 Oleg Bernov - Bass, Vocals
 Jen Cass - Vocals
 Leo Chelyapov - Clarinet, Saxophone
 Igor Khramov - Trombone, Vocals
 Svetoslav Lazarov - Engineer
 Gazelle Gaignaire - Photography

External links 
 Red Elvises' official site
 Grooving To The Moscow Beat on iTunes

Red Elvises albums
1996 albums